How to Explain Pictures to a Dead Hare is a performance piece staged by the German artist Joseph Beuys on 26 November 1965 at the Galerie Schmela in Düsseldorf. While it was only Beuys’s first solo exhibition in a private gallery, it is sometimes referred to as his best known action.

Process
At the beginning of the performance Beuys locked the gallery doors from the inside, leaving the gallery-goers outside. They could observe the scene within only through the windows. With his head entirely coated in honey and gold leaf, he began to explain pictures to a dead hare. Whispering to the dead animal on his arm in an apparent dialog, he processed through the exhibit from artwork to artwork. Occasionally he would stop and return to the center of the gallery, where he stepped over a dead fir tree that lay on the floor. After three hours the public was let into the room. Beuys sat upon a stool in the entrance area with the hare on his arm and his back to the onlookers.

Interpretation and context
The performance was the high point of Beuys' development of a broadened definition of art, which had already begun in his drawings of the 1950s. He celebrated the ritual of "explaining art" with an action that was, for his viewers, effectively silent. 

The relationship between thought, speech, and form in this performance was also characteristic of Beuys. In his last speech Speaking about Germany (German: Sprechen über Deutschland, 1985) he emphasized that he was essentially a man of words. In another instance he is quoted as saying: "When I speak, I try to guide that power's impulse so that it flows into a more fully descriptive language, which is the spiritual perception of growth." The integration of speech and conversation into his visual works plays a meaningful role in How to Explain Pictures to a Dead Hare.

The hare is an animal with broad, centuries-old symbolic meaning in many religions. In Greek mythology it was associated with the love goddess Aphrodite, to the Romans and Germanic tribes it was a symbol of fertility, and in Christianity it came to be connected with the Resurrection. This interpretation is also supported by the "mask" that Beuys wore during his performance: gold as a symbol for the power of the sun, wisdom, and purity, and honey as a Germanic symbol for rebirth. 

Beuys explained:
 
       

Such materials and actions had specific symbolic value for Beuys. For example, honey was the product of bees who, for Beuys (following Rudolf Steiner), represented an ideal society of warmth and brotherhood. Gold had its importance within alchemy, and iron, the metal of Mars, stood for the masculine principles of strength and connection to the earth. A photograph from the performance, in which Beuys is sitting with the hare, has been described "by some critics as a new Mona Lisa of the 20th century," though Beuys did not agree with that.

The performance is considered a key work, and was re-created by Marina Abramović in 2005 at the Solomon R. Guggenheim Museum in New York as part of her series Seven Easy Pieces.

Citations

Note on translations 
The English translations of quotes from Beuys used in this article are not in any way official. Any misrepresentation of the artist's meaning is unintentional. For the purpose of transparency the original German is presented below.

Further reading
Thompson, Nato. Becoming Animal: contemporary art in the animal kingdom MIT Press, 2005  P. 10 

Works by Joseph Beuys
Rabbits and hares in art
Performances
1965 works